Paul Bindel (7 January 1894 – 29 May 1973) was a German painter. His work was part of the painting event in the art competition at the 1936 Summer Olympics.

References

External links
 

1894 births
1973 deaths
20th-century German painters
20th-century German male artists
German male painters
Olympic competitors in art competitions
Artists from Magdeburg